Trivest Partners, L.P. is the oldest private equity firm in the Southeast U.S., founded in 1981, and focuses exclusively on founder and family-owned businesses. Trivest is headquartered in Miami, Florida with regional offices in Charlotte, Chicago, Los Angeles, New York and Toronto. Trivest has provided "Private Equity for Founders" in the lower middle market through its flexibility in transaction structuring and related "Just Say No" program, which eliminates the typical pain points faced by founders looking to outside investment. The firm is largely industry-agnostic, but focuses on investments in the consumer, business services, healthcare, value-added distribution and niche manufacturing sectors.

Overview
The Trivest team is led by Managing Partner Troy D. Templeton. Troy joined the firm in 1989 and plays a key leadership role in Trivest's buyout activities, investment sourcing, resource allocation, portfolio oversight and firm administration. Jamie Elias, David Gershman, Jorge Gross Jr., Forest Wester, Russ Wilson and Steve Reynolds are also Partners of Trivest.

Trivest was an early entrant to the leveraged buyout space in the early 1980s and has completed investments in over 350 companies representing roughly $7 billion in value since its founding. Since its inception in 1981, Trivest has raised six institutional private equity funds, with total investor commitments of over $2.5 billion, dedicated to leveraged buyout investments in founder and family-owned middle market companies. Trivest is currently actively investing from Trivest Fund VI, raised in August 2018 with commitments of $630 million. In addition, in 2017 Trivest launched the Trivest Growth Investment Fund ("TGIF"), a $225 million fund committed to making non-control and growth investments in founder and family-owned businesses. Two new funds were raised at the end of 2019, closing in early 2020: Trivest Growth Investment Fund II ("TGIF II"), a $435 million non-control fund; and Trivest Discovery Fund, a $235 million control fund, currently investing in smaller businesses within fragmented industries.

In 36 months from 2019 through 2021, Trivest closed 137 total investments, making it one of the most active firms of its size in the country.

The firm currently has 39 portfolio companies, accounting for roughly $2.5 billion in aggregate sales and more than 8,500 employees portfolio-wide.

Among the firm’s most notable prior investments are Turnpoint Services, Jon-Don, Oil Changers, Big Truck Rental, Lamark Media, AM Conservation, Ellery Homestyles, Endeavor Telecom, Group III International, Hazmasters, National Auto Care, Onepath Systems, Pelican Water Systems, National Carwash Solutions, Take 5 Oil Change, Wise Company, HandStands, North Star Seafood, ATX Networks, Directed Electronics, Twinstar International, Herbal Magic, Aero Products International (makers of the Aerobed) and Sun Pharmaceuticals (Banana Boat brand).

Awards

 2019 Inc Magazine "PE50" list of the Top 50 Founder-Friendly Private Equity Firms (Inaugural list)
 2019 Buyouts Magazine Small-Market Deal of the Year for Pelican Water Systems
 2020 Inc Magazine "PE50" list of the Top 50 Founder-Friendly Private Equity Firms (One of only 18 firms on the list both years)
 2020 Buyouts Magazine Middle-Market Deal of the Year for Turnpoint Services
 2020 RCP Advisors Deal of the Year for Turnpoint Services
 2021 Grady Campbell "Elite 10"
 2021 Inc Magazine Founder-Friendly Investors
 2022 Grady Campbell "Elite 10"

References

 2020 Small Market Deal of the Year: Trivest Partners / Buyouts Magazine, April 8, 2020
 Trivest Closes New Private Equity Funds / Business Wire, January 31, 2020
 The 50 Best Private Equity Firms for Entrepreneurs / Inc Magazine, July/August 2019
 How This Florida PE Firm Helped a Solar Business Grow Revenue More Than 15X / Inc Magazine, November 2021

External links
 Trivest (company website)

Private equity firms of the United States
Financial services companies established in 1981
Companies based in Miami